An election to the Carmarthenshire County Council was held in March 1934. It was preceded by the 1931 election and followed by the 1937 election.

Overview of the result

The Independent group remained the majority grouping on the Council, with Labour polling strongly in the industrial south and east of the county. In the Llanelli area, Communist Party candidates contested a number of seats but polled a low vote in all cases.

Boundary changes

There were no boundary changes.

Unopposed returns

Only a minority of the 53 divisions were contested.

Contested elections

A greater number of contests took place in 1934 in Carmarthenshire than at any time since the First World War. This was as a result of more contests in rural areas between rival Independent candidates.

Summary of results

This section summarises the detailed results which are noted in the following sections. As noted, there was ambiguity in some cases over the party affiliation.

This table summarises the result of the elections in all wards. 53 councillors were elected.

|}

Ward results

Abergwili

Ammanford

Bettws

Caio

Carmarthen Eastern Ward (Lower Division)

Carmarthen Eastern Ward (Upper Division)

Carmarthen Western Ward (Lower Division)

Carmarthen Western Ward (Upper Division)

Cenarth

Cilycwm

Conwil

Kidwelly

Laugharne

Llanarthney

Llanboidy

Llandebie North

Llandebie South

Llandilo Rural

Llandilo Urban

Llandovery

Llandyssilio

Llanedy

Llanegwad

Llanelly Division.1

Llanelly Division 2

Llanelly Division 3

Llanelly Division 4

Llanelly Division 5

Llanelly Division 6

Llanelly Division 7

Llanelly Division 8

Llanelly Rural, Berwick

Llanelly Rural, Hengoed

Llanelly Rural, Westfa and Glyn

Llanfihangel Aberbythick

Llanfihangel-ar-Arth

Llangadock

Llangeler

Llangendeirne

Llangennech

Llangunnor

Llanon

Llansawel

Llanstephan

Llanybyther

Myddfai

Pembrey North

Pembrey South

Quarter Bach

Rhydcymmerai

St Clears

St Ishmael

Trelech

Whitland

Election of aldermen

In addition to the 53 councillors the council consisted of 17 county aldermen. Aldermen were elected by the council, and served a six-year term. Following the elections the following nine aldermen were elected (with the number of votes in each case).

References

Carmarthenshire County Council elections
1934 Welsh local elections